Poplat is a village in Bosnia and Herzegovina in Berkovići municipality, belonging to the Republika Srpska entity. According to the 1991 census, the village had 457 inhabitants . Before 1981, the official name of the settlement was "Donji (Lower) Poplat".

Geography
Poplat is located in Herzegovina

Population
According to the Census in 1991, the town had 457 inhabitants.

Famous personalities
 Dimitrije Mitrinović, Serbian critic, theorist, philosopher, essayist, poet and translator

See also

Berkovići
Eastern Herzegovina

References

External links
 http://www.opstinaberkovici.com

Populated places in Berkovići